Kankaanpää is a town and municipality of Finland.

Kankaanpää may also refer to:

 Kankaanpää, Säkylä, a village in Finland
 Katja Kankaanpää (born 1981), Finnish mixed martial artist
 Tiina Kankaanpää (born 1976), Finnish discus thrower